Finding Kind is a 2011 American documentary film directed by Lauren Parsekian. It follows two friends traveling across America exploring the topic of how women can be mean to other women.

In May 2011, filmmakers Lauren Parsekian and Molly Stroud went on a tour of the U.S., showing the documentary to school students and encouraging them to fill out apology cards for someone they've bullied or to write descriptions of how they themselves have experienced bullying.

Cast
 Debra Parsekian ... Herself
 Lauren Parsekian ... Herself
 Molly Stroud ... Herself
 Tetia Stroud ... Herself

References

External links
 
 Inspired Nation: The Kind Campaign Stopping Hate in Schools Across the Country (CBS News)

2011 films
American documentary films
2011 documentary films
Films about bullying
Documentary films about women
2010s English-language films
2010s American films